William Ollis (12 August 1871 – May 1940) was an English professional footballer who played as a right half. Born in Bordesley Green, Birmingham, Ollis played 121 games in the Football Alliance and the Football League for Small Heath. He was part of the team which won the inaugural Second Division championship in 1892–93 and gained promotion to the First Division via the Test Match system the following season. He also played for Warwick County and Hereford Thistle. He died in Birmingham at the age of 68.

Honours
Small Heath
Football League Second Division: 1892–93
Second Division: runners-up 1893–94

References

1871 births
1940 deaths
Footballers from Birmingham, West Midlands
English footballers
Association football wing halves
Warwick County F.C. players
Birmingham City F.C. players
Hereford Thistle F.C. players
Football Alliance players
English Football League players
Date of death missing